The 2011 North Dakota Fighting Sioux football team represented the University of North Dakota as a member of the Great West Conference (GWC) during the 2011 NCAA Division I FCS football season. Led by fourth-year head coach Chris Mussman, the Fighting Sioux compiled an overall record of 8–3 with a mark of 3–1 in conference play, sharing the GWC title with Cal Poly. North Dakota played home games at the Alerus Center in Grand Forks, North Dakota. This was team's final year as a member of the Great West Conference as North Dakota became a full member of the Big Sky Conference in 2012.

Schedule

References

North Dakota
North Dakota Fighting Hawks football seasons
Great West Conference football champion seasons
North Dakota Fighting Sioux football